Colin Sears is an American drummer who has performed in Bloody Mannequin Orchestra, Dag Nasty, The Marshes, Rumblepuppy, Grave Goods, Bloodbats, Los Vampiros, Thundering Asteroids! and currently Handgun Bravado and The Valley Floor.  He was in the original incarnation of Fugazi.
In the early 1990s he joined Vic Bondi's (former Articles of Faith guitarist/singer) band Alloy to record & tour Europe and the US.

He currently works as a city planner in Portland, Oregon.

References

Living people
American punk rock drummers
American male drummers
American drummers
Post-hardcore musicians
Fugazi members
Dag Nasty members
Year of birth missing (living people)